Daiane Menezes Rodrigues (born 22 July 1986) is a Brazilian professional footballer who plays as a defender for Ferroviária and the Brazil women's national team.

Club career
Rodrigues joined Ferroviária for a third spell in 2013 and was appointed captain of the team. She led the "Guerreiras Grenás" to the 2014 Copa do Brasil de Futebol Feminino and 2015 Copa Libertadores Femenina titles.

In January 2018, Rodrigues was announced as the second ever signing for S.L. Benfica's newly formed women's football team, following her compatriot Dani Neuhaus.

International career
As an unattached player at club level Rodrigues was part of the Brazil under-20 selection at the FIFA U-20 Women's World Cup in 2006. She was named to the tournament All-Star Team. In March 2012, national coach Jorge Barcellos named Rodrigues in a 33-player preliminary Brazil squad for the London 2012 Olympics.

Alongside four other uncapped players, Vadão called up 31-year-old Rodrigues for two friendlies against Chile in November 2017. She made substitute appearances in both games to win her first senior caps for Brazil.

Honours
Benfica
 Campeonato Nacional II Divisão Feminino: 2018–19
 Taça de Portugal: 2018–19
 Taça da Liga: 2019–20
 Supertaça de Portugal: 2019

References

External links
 

1986 births
Living people
Brazilian women's footballers
Brazil women's international footballers
Brazilian expatriate women's footballers
Brazilian expatriate sportspeople in Portugal
Expatriate women's footballers in Portugal
People from São Carlos
Women's association football fullbacks
Associação Ferroviária de Esportes (women) players
Sport Club Corinthians Paulista (women) players
S.L. Benfica (women) footballers
Campeonato Nacional de Futebol Feminino players
Footballers from São Paulo (state)
Sport Club Internacional (women) players